Christian Oster (born 1949) is a French writer. He has written more than a dozen novels, and he is also a prolific author of children's books. Noted works include My Big Apartment (1999) which won the Prix Médicis, and The Cleaning Woman (2001). The latter was adapted into a film by Claude Berri.

References

French writers
Living people
1949 births
Prix Médicis winners